Bratislava-Petržalka railway station is a station in Petržalka, the southern part of Bratislava. The station was built in 1897. The station was rebuilt in the 1990s as a terminus for international trains to and from Vienna, which restarted in 1999 after having stopped in 1945. Shuttle trains between the station and Wien Hauptbahnhof operate approximately once per hour.

The station is a connection point between the southern Slovak 25 kV/50 Hz electrification and Austrian 15 kV/16.7 Hz.

Public transport bus line No. 80 connects the station with the city center and No. 93 (it is necessary to use station's underpass to get to the stop of No. 93) connects the station with Bratislava main railway station where it is possible to transfer to line No. 61 to the M. R. Štefánik Airport or to line No. 210 to the central bus station at Mlynské Nivy.

Gallery

References

External links
 Bratislava-Petržalka Railway Station

Railway stations in Bratislava
Railway stations opened in 1897
Railway stations in Slovakia opened in the 19th century